Yellowjackets is an American thriller drama television series created by Ashley Lyle and Bart Nickerson. It stars an ensemble cast led by Sophie Nélisse, Jasmin Savoy Brown, Sophie Thatcher, Sammi Hanratty, Liv Hewson, and Courtney Eaton as a group of teenagers involved in a plane crash in 1996, with Melanie Lynskey, Tawny Cypress, Juliette Lewis, Christina Ricci, Lauren Ambrose, and Simone Kessell portraying their adult counterparts. Ella Purnell, Steven Krueger, Warren Kole, and Kevin Alves also star.

The series premiered on Showtime on November 14, 2021. It received critical acclaim for its story and cast performances. Its accolades include seven Primetime Emmy Award nominations, including Outstanding Drama Series and acting nominations for Lynskey and Ricci. In December 2021, the series was renewed for a second season, which is set to premiere on March 26, 2023. In December 2022, the series was renewed for a third season.

Premise
In 1996, a team of New Jersey high school girls’ soccer players travel to Seattle for a national tournament. While flying over Canada, their plane crashes deep in the wilderness and the surviving team members are left stranded for nineteen months. The series chronicles their attempts to stay alive while also dealing with their current lives in 2021.

Cast and characters

Main

 Melanie Lynskey and Sophie Nélisse as the adult and teenage versions of Shauna Shipman. In high school, Shauna was Jackie's best friend, but was having an affair with her boyfriend, Jeff. She was accepted into Brown University prior to the crash. After the crash, Shauna immediately adapts to life in the wilderness and becomes close friends with Taissa. As an adult, Shauna is married to Jeff, but is dissatisfied with her life as a stay-at-home mother and has a strained relationship with her rebellious daughter Callie.
 Tawny Cypress and Jasmin Savoy Brown as the adult and teenage versions of Taissa Turner. In high school, Taissa was determined to win the national championship by any means necessary. She injured fellow teammate Allie during soccer practice, whom she thought was not good enough for the tournament. After the crash, she begins dating Vanessa and becomes close friends with Shauna. As an adult, Taissa is married to Simone and is running for the New Jersey state senate, but begins having problems with her unstable son Sammy.
 Ella Purnell as Jackie Taylor. In high school, Jackie was the captain of the Yellowjackets soccer team, Shauna's best friend and Jeff's girlfriend. She was accepted into Rutgers University prior to the crash. After the crash, Jackie has the most difficulty adapting to life in the wilderness and her leadership skills are called into question. She develops a hostile rivalry with Natalie and begins to doubt her friendship with Shauna.
 Steven Krueger as Ben Scott, the assistant coach of the Yellowjackets soccer team. His right leg is mangled in the wreckage of the crash and Misty amputates it to save his life. While being taken care of by Misty, Ben has to simultaneously deal with his injury and the fact that he was the only adult who survived the crash.
 Warren Kole as Jeff Sadecki. In high school, Jeff was Jackie's boyfriend, but was cheating on her with Shauna prior to the crash. As an adult, he is married to Shauna and owns a furniture store.
 Christina Ricci and Sammi Hanratty as the adult and teenage versions of Misty Quigley. In high school, Misty was the equipment manager of the Yellowjackets soccer team. She was frequently bullied and shunned by her peers, who saw her as creepy and weird. After the crash, Misty demonstrates knowledge useful for survival and develops a crush on Coach Ben. As an adult, she works as a care facility nurse and has become a ruthless manipulator of others.
 Juliette Lewis and Sophie Thatcher as the adult and teenage versions of Natalie "Nat" Scatorccio. In high school, Natalie was labeled a "burnout" due to her drug and alcohol abuse, though she cared little about what people thought of her. After the crash, Natalie proves to be the most proficient with the hunting rifle and begins dating Travis. As an adult, she returns to New Jersey after finishing a rehab program paid for by Taissa, but struggles to maintain sobriety.
 Lauren Ambrose (season 2) and Liv Hewson (recurring season 1; main, season 2) as the adult and teenage versions of Vanessa "Van" Palmer. In high school, Vanessa was the goalkeeper of the Yellowjackets soccer team. After the crash, she begins dating Taissa.
 Simone Kessell (season 2) and Courtney Eaton (recurring season 1; main, season 2) as the adult and teenage versions of Lottie Matthews, a member of the Yellowjackets soccer team who suffers from schizophrenia. After the crash, she begins to experience disturbing visions when she runs out of her medication and becomes close friends with Laura Lee.
 Kevin Alves as the teenage version of Travis Martinez (recurring season 1; main, season 2), Coach Martinez's elder son and Javi's brother. After the crash, he begins dating Natalie.

Recurring

 Rekha Sharma as Jessica Roberts (season 1), a fake reporter investigating the survivors of the crash.
 Jane Widdop as Laura Lee (season 1), a deeply religious member of the Yellowjackets soccer team. After the crash, she becomes close friends with Lottie.
 Alexa Barajas as Mari, a sarcastic member of the Yellowjackets soccer team.
 Keeya King (season 1) and Nia Sondaya (season 2) as Akilah, a member of the Yellowjackets soccer team who is knowledgeable of edible plants.
 Sarah Desjardins as Callie Sadecki, Jeff and Shauna's daughter.
 Rukiya Bernard as Simone Abara, Taissa's wife.
 Aiden Stoxx as Sammy Abara-Turner, Taissa and Simone's son.
 Peter Gadiot as Adam Martin, an artist who has an affair with Shauna after they have a minor auto collision.
 Alex Wyndham as Kevyn Tan. In high school, he was best friends with Natalie prior to the crash. As an adult, he works as a police officer.
 Luciano Leroux as Javi Martinez, Coach Martinez's younger son, Travis's brother and the youngest survivor of the crash.
 Elijah Wood as Walter (season 2), a citizen detective.

Guest
 Jack DePew as the teenage version of Jeff Sadecki
 Charlie Wright as the teenage version of Kevyn Tan
 Gabrielle Rose as Mrs. Taylor, Jackie's mother.
 Carlos Sanz as Coach Bill Martinez (season 1), the head coach of the Yellowjackets soccer team and Travis and Javi's father. He was killed in the crash and the remaining survivors discover his body impaled by a tree branch.
 Tonya Cornelisse and Pearl Amanda Dickson as the adult and teenage versions of Allie Stevens. In high school, Allie was the only freshman on the Yellowjackets soccer team. Her leg was broken by Taissa during soccer practice and was unable to participate in the tournament.

Episodes

Series overview

Season 1 (2021–22)

Season 2

Production

Development
The idea for the series was largely influenced by the Donner Party (1846–1847) and the Andes flight disaster (1972), both true stories about people who resorted to cannibalism to survive. In August 2017, Warner Bros. Pictures announced an all-female film adaptation of William Golding's Lord of the Flies, a novel about a young group of boys stranded on an island. Ashley Lyle read the announcement and found that a lot of people were skeptical that young girls could descend into the same barbarism as young boys. With that thought in mind, she conceived the idea for the series with her husband Bart Nickerson as a "metaphor for teenage hierarchy" and placed a large part of the series in New Jersey, the state they both grew up in. The title, Yellowjackets, came up on a Google search for sports team names; Lyle said it was a "perfect fit thematically" as yellowjackets are "very dependent on a queen and the dynamics of the hive are very specific." Lyle and Nickerson are also credited as showrunners alongside Jonathan Lisco, who was brought to the series by executive producer Karyn Kusama. Lyle added, "I just wanted to tell what felt like a very real story about teenage girls."

Lyle and Nickerson pitched the series with a 35-minute presentation, which included talks about the first season's ending and a five-season storyline. The series was originally going to take place in the 1970s and the 1990s, but both time periods were moved twenty years forward to make the setting more familiar to viewers. Nickerson said the use of two timelines allowed for the studying of interpersonal dynamics and how trauma can affect a person's life. HBO was a contender to purchase the series but ultimately rejected it, in part due to its similarities with Euphoria, one of its own properties. Lyle says the smartest question she heard during the pre-production phase was from HBO's Francesca Orsi and David Levine, who asked, "What are you trying to say with this show?" In his answer, Nickerson said the show was going to deconstruct the "organizing principles of a society". Yellowjackets was eventually sold to The Mark Gordon Company, a production company owned by Entertainment One. The project was then pitched to Gary Levine, president of entertainment for Showtime Networks, who was immediately on board. On May 9, 2018, Showtime announced it had acquired the rights to the series.

On December 16, 2021, after the first five episodes aired, the series was renewed for a second season. Levine said they had "not heard the pitch for season 2, the writers' room has not even come together yet, they are going to come together in January. I'm sure Ashley, Bart, and Jonathan have some loose ideas but they hadn't fleshed out their ideas and they certainly haven't conveyed them to us." On February 9, 2022, Levine said the creators had "always given us hints about things to come, but we haven't done a long-range plan. We wanted to make the first season count. We've all buried ourselves in that first season and worked hard to make it the success it was. They [last week] went into the writer's room and with Jonathan Lisco to start to unearth what can happen in season two. I love that they have some general idea of a five-year arc, but we take it one season at a time and get very granular about making it satisfying." By May 2022, the writers were "just getting started on the actual scripts." On December 15, 2022, three months before the premiere of the second season, Showtime renewed the series for a third season.

Casting

Season 1
The pilot episode was not written with any actresses in mind and auditions were held in Los Angeles. "We decided pretty early on we weren't going to get overly focused on a physical match," Lyle mentioned. As a result, some cast members had to dye their hair and wear contact lenses to match the physical characteristics of their counterparts. Melanie Lynskey was the first person to join the cast. Lyle said the role of Shauna was "the trickiest to cast" because they "wanted to find an actress who could embody somebody who is really trying to figure out who they are, which is kind of a tricky internal thing to express through her acting." Lynskey questioned the showrunners and extracted as much information as she could about her character's past and the five-season storyline to improve her performance. For the role of Natalie, Nickerson said they searched for "someone who was really free-spirited and unique who could play both a sort of wildness and a vulnerability." Though most of the auditions were held in-person, Sophie Thatcher submitted a self-recorded audition tape and was cast as Natalie before Juliette Lewis, who portrays the character's adult counterpart. When asked if the group's survival would depend on their gender, Thatcher replied, "I think naturally, especially at such a young age, women are more emotionally intelligent. So to turn into that cannibalistic mindset ... it maybe took them longer just because I think women are smarter than men. But I think that's it. Besides that, there's no difference. They're going to go batshit crazy."

Nickerson said it was vital to find two actresses who could portray Misty with "a deep kind of humanity that could make it feel lived in and real"; the role was eventually given to Sammi Hanratty and Christina Ricci. On joining the cast, Hanratty said she originally auditioned for the role of Natalie before being brought back four times to audition for the role of Misty: "I'm not gonna lie, I was so crushed [when I didn't get Natalie] because I loved the project. They said they would keep me in mind. Then, I think it was about a week later that I got the audition for Misty, which was so exciting. Because I was like, 'Oh, this girl is interesting as can be." To give her another chance, Lyle and Nickerson wrote a scene specifically for the casting process in which Misty confronts a teacher over cheating. After Hanratty was brought back, Lyle said "It was immediate. As soon as she read that scene for us, we said, 'OK, she is Misty.'" Hanratty described the auditions as being "really intense". She did not meet any of her co-stars until the table read for the pilot. When asked if she was treated differently when in costume, she added, "I don't think we've talked about this, but I was seeing a therapist while I was in Canada, and that was something that we discussed. I was definitely treated differently ... I got more self-conscious, and my walk even changed a bit. I just felt like a bigger target, you know, as a person."

According to Nickerson, Jasmin Savoy Brown and Tawny Cypress were cast as Taissa because they were both able to portray her with a "level of dynamic strength" as well as "vulnerability and fragility". Ella Purnell portrays Jackie, a character who proved difficult to cast. Lyle said the character was supposed to be a stereotypical popular girl with "little cracks of that façade". She explained, "I think that her insecurity, her vulnerabilities needed to be on display pretty early on or you'd end up hating her and that was sort of the opposite of what we wanted the audience to feel." Lynskey, Cypress, and Brown were announced as series regulars in October 2019, with Lewis, Ricci, Purnell, Hanratty, Thatcher, and Sophie Nélisse, joining the cast in November. The following month, Ava Allan, Courtney Eaton, and Liv Hewson were cast in recurring roles. In June 2021, it was reported Warren Kole, Peter Gadiot, Keeya King, Alex Wyndham, Sarah Desjardins, Kevin Alves, and Alexa Barajas would also star.

Season 2
Casting for the second season began in mid-2022. In August 2022, Lauren Ambrose and Simone Kessell joined the cast to play the adult versions of Van and Lottie; their roles were also upped from recurring to series regulars. Elijah Wood and Nuha Jes Izman were also added to the cast in season-long recurring guest roles, while Kevin Alves's role as teenage Travis was upped from recurring to series regular. Wood will play Walter, "new citizen detective who is not represented by a younger self on the show". Jason Ritter, who is married to Melanie Lynskey, guest stars in one episode of the second season.  

In January 2023, Variety reported that Keeya King, who played teen Akilah in season one, had exited the series. Her role was recast with Nia Sondaya. Nicole Maines was cast as Lisa, an associate of adult Lottie attempting to recover from past trauma.  Additionally, François Arnaud will guest star in four episodes portraying Paul. His character is described as, "a New York writer and secret boyfriend of Coach Scott (Steven Kreuger) who reminds Coach Scott of what might have been".

Filming
The pilot was greenlit in September 2019 and shot in Los Angeles in November. According to location manager Jimmie Lee, several scenes from the pilot were filmed on top of the ski slopes on Mammoth Mountain. The rehab scenes were shot in a mansion located at 26848 Pacific Coast Highway, while a number of scenes set in the high school were filmed in and around John Marshall High School in Los Feliz, Los Angeles. In an interview, Lynskey said the masturbation scene from the pilot represented her character's lack of boundaries. In the pilot's opening scene, a flash-forward shows a group covered in fur clothing. Hanratty was the only cast member present while the scene was shot and the other characters were played by stunt coordinators. Hanratty says the writers have not told the cast which characters appear in that scene: "We all have our theories on who that is too, and we have a group chat in our cast where we try to come up with theories ourselves of what's going on and who we think is who."

In December 2020, Showtime gave Yellowjackets a series order. Filming restarted in Vancouver on May 3, 2021, and concluded in early October, with the young and older cast taking weekly turns to shoot their scenes. Aside from Vancouver, other filming locations included the Panther Paintball & Airsoft Sports Park in Surrey, which was used as the site of the plane crash, and The Bridge Studios in Burnaby. The plane crash scene took two days to shoot. The orgy scene from episode nine was organized with intimacy coordinator Katherine Kadler. Eaton described it as "uncomfortable scene to shoot" due to its depiction of sexual assault. In an interview, Lynskey said Cypress, Ricci, and Lewis stood up for her after she was body shamed by a crew member, with Lewis writing a letter to the producers on her behalf. In November 2021, Purnell summarized the timeline of the production: "Here's how it went; we shot the pilot, we took like a year and a half off in COVID and then we went to Canada and shot the whole season in six months. We were in this super intense immersive bubble. We wrapped three weeks ago and now I'm doing a press junket. It's been crazy."

Filming for the second season began in August 2022, with the first episode directed by Daisy von Scherler Mayer. In early February 2023, the cast of the 1990s timeline of the series completed filming their scenes.

Music
The music for the pilot was composed by Theodore Shapiro. The rest of the first season was scored by Craig Wedren and Anna Waronker, members of the rock bands Shudder to Think and That Dog, respectively. Wedren was invited to the series by Kusama after the series was picked up and Shapiro was unable to return. The main theme song, "No Return", was written and performed by Wedren and Waronker, who said they "aimed to channel our off-kilter '90s roots into something that felt like 'then', but could only have been made now, just like the show." Lyle and Nickerson were initially hesitant with the idea of featuring a theme song due to their growing rarity in the mainstream but were eventually convinced otherwise. "Mother Mother" by Tracy Bonham was used as the temp music for the theme, which first appears in episode three and features the sounds of a Farfisa organ. According to Wedren, "The producers really, really encouraged us to go out on multiple limbs and really be experimental and try stuff, which is such a rare direction to get." Lakeshore Records made "No Return" available to stream and download on January 6, 2022. A soundtrack album was also released on Spotify.

Release
A premiere for the series was held on November 10, 2021, at the Hollywood Legion Post 43 in Los Angeles. Yellowjackets debuted on Showtime on November 14. The second season is set to premiere on March 26, 2023, and the episode will be available two days earlier to stream for Showtime subscribers.

The first season was released on DVD and manufactured-on-demand Blu-ray on July 19, 2022.

Reception

Critical response

Season 1 

 Metacritic, which uses a weighted average, assigned a score of 78 out of 100 based on 28 critics, indicating "generally favorable reviews".

The first six out of ten episodes of the first season were given to critics to review ahead of the series premiere. Entertainment Weeklys Kristen Baldwin graded the show with a B+ and gave praise to the performances and its story: 

Candice Frederick from TheWrap found the storyline to be a bit complicated:  Writing for Rolling Stone, Alan Sepinwall gave the series three stars and a half out of five and described it as a combination of Lord of the Flies, It, Lost, Alone, and the works of Megan Abbott. Sepinwall added:

Season 2 
 Metacritic, which uses a weighted average, assigned a score of 82 out of 100 based on 8 critics, indicating "universal acclaim".

Critics' top ten list

Ratings
Yellowjackets is the second-most streamed series in Showtime's history behind Dexter: New Blood. According to Showtime, the penultimate episode of the first season was watched by 1.41 million viewers across all platforms, while the season finale (the first episode to not air after an episode of Dexter: New Blood) brought 1.3 million viewers across all platforms. Yellowjackets averaged more than 5 million weekly viewers, the highest for a freshman series on the network since Billions in 2016. In January 2022, Vulture Alison Willmore and Kathryn VanArendonk discussed Showtime's decision to release episodes weekly instead of launching the entire season on the same day, noting the positive word-of-mouth and time given to a viewer to theorize: "In an era when shows and movies seem to barely manage to break through before being pushed aside by whatever's new, and when Netflix is so dominant that other platforms have to really fight for attention at all, Yellowjackets has sustained a conversation all while airing on Showtime."

Awards and nominations

Explanatory notes

References

External links
 
 

2020s American drama television series
2020s American horror television series
2020s American LGBT-related drama television series
2020s American mystery television series
2020s American teen drama television series
2021 American television series debuts
American thriller television series
Cannibalism in fiction
Coming-of-age television shows
Disaster television series
Nonlinear narrative television series
Psychological drama television and other works
Showtime (TV network) original programming
Television series about cults
Television series about teenagers
Television series by Entertainment One
Television series set in 1996
Television series set in 1997
Television series set in 2021
Television shows about aviation accidents or incidents
Television shows filmed in Burnaby
Television shows filmed in California
Television shows filmed in Los Angeles
Television shows filmed in Vancouver
Television shows set in New Jersey
Television shows set in Ontario